RAL or variation, may refer to:

People
 Ral Donner (1943–1984), U.S. rock singer
 Ral Rosario (born 1952), Filipino swimmer
 Manjeet Singh Ral (born 1985), British Indian musician

Fictional characters
 Ral, a character from Ral Grad
 Ral Dorn, a Marvel Comics character from Dragon Lord (comics)
 Devinoni Ral, a character from Star Trek
 Petra Ral, a character from Attack on Titan
 Ramba Ral, a character from Gundam

Places
 Mont-ral, Alt Camp, Tarragona, Catalonia, Spain
 Riverside Municipal Airport (IATA airport code RAL), California, USA
 Rayners Lane tube station (station code RAL), London, England, UK; a London Underground station

 Radio Astronomy Laboratory, University of California, Berkeley, USA
 Riverbank Laboratories (RAL: Riverbank Acoustical Laboratories), Geneva, Illinois, USA
 Rutherford Appleton Laboratory, Chilton, Oxfordshire, England, UK; a national research lab

Medicine, biology
 Raltegravir, an antiretroviral medication
 Zearalenone, an estrogenic metabolite
 Ral protein
 Ral-A protein and gene
 Ral-B protein and gene
 retinaldehyde (RAL), a polyene chromaphore

Other uses
 RAL colour standard for colour matching
 Ralte language (ISO 639 code ral)
 RaL, the Rayleigh number w.r.t. length; see heat transfer coefficient
 respectful adoption language, part of the language of adoption
 Refund anticipation loan, in the US
 No. 605 Squadron RAF (squadron code RAL)
 Royal Arctic Line, a Greenland freight company 
 Regional AGMARK Laboratory (RAL), a certification lab for Agmark

See also

 R.A.L. Fell (1895–1973), British scholar
 Ral Ral, an Aboriginal chief from South Australia, namesake of Calperum Station (reserve)
 Ral Ral, former name of the Calperum Station (reserve)
 Ral Ral Creek, a tributary of the Murray River; see List of Murray River distances
 
 
 Rall (surname)